Djugu territory is a district of Ituri, Democratic Republic of the Congo. Its capital is also named Djugu.

History 
Armed conflict first appeared in Djugu in December 2017, resulting in the displacement of 20,000 people. Since then 4,000 people have been killed by various armed organizations, including CODECO.

In 2021, during an ongoing insurgency by Islamist rebels, Djugu fell into a humanitarian crisis. Since November 2021, rebels have attacked several separate IDP sites, including Drodro, a camp for internally displaced people, resulting in heavy casualties. At least 58 civilians were killed since October. On 2 February 2022, a CODECO attack killed over 60 people. A few weeks later, CODECO slew 18 people in the village of Banyali Kilo.

600,000 people living in Djugu territory are IDPs, 85,000 of whom became displaced in 2021.

List of localities 

 Banyali Kilo
 Djugu
 Drodro
 Fataki
 Iga Barrière
 Jina
 Kobu
 Ladejo
 Lopa
 Roe

References 

Territories of Ituri Province